In mathematics, the Fredholm integral equation is an integral equation whose solution gives rise to Fredholm theory, the study of Fredholm kernels and Fredholm operators.  The integral equation was studied by Ivar Fredholm.  A useful method to solve such equations, the Adomian decomposition method, is due to George Adomian.

Equation of the first kind

A Fredholm equation is an integral equation in which the term containing the kernel function (defined below) has constants as integration limits. A closely related form is the Volterra integral equation which has variable integral limits.

An inhomogeneous Fredholm equation of the first kind is written as

and the problem is, given the continuous kernel function  and the function , to find the function .

Equation of the second kind
An inhomogeneous Fredholm equation of the second kind is given as

 
Given the kernel  , and the function  , the problem is typically to find the function  .

A standard approach to solving this is to use iteration, amounting to the resolvent formalism; written as a series, the solution is known as the Liouville–Neumann series.

General theory
The general theory underlying the Fredholm equations is known as Fredholm theory.  One of the principal results is that the kernel   yields a compact operator.  Compactness may be shown by invoking equicontinuity. As an operator, it has a spectral theory that can be understood in terms of a discrete spectrum of eigenvalues that tend to 0.

Applications
Fredholm equations arise naturally in the theory of signal processing, for example as the famous spectral concentration problem popularized by David Slepian. The operators involved are the same as linear filters. They also commonly arise in linear forward modeling and inverse problems. In physics, the solution of such integral equations allows for experimental spectra to be related to various underlying distributions, for instance the mass distribution of polymers in a polymeric melt,
 or the distribution of relaxation times in the system. 
In addition, Fredholm integral equations also arise in fluid mechanics problems involving hydrodynamic interactions near finite-sized elastic interfaces.

A specific application of Fredholm equation is the generation of photo-realistic images in computer graphics, in which the Fredholm equation is used to model light transport from the virtual light sources to the image plane. The Fredholm equation is often called the rendering equation in this context.

See also
 Liouville–Neumann series
 Volterra integral equation
 Fredholm alternative

References

Further reading 
 Integral Equations at EqWorld: The World of Mathematical Equations.
 A.D. Polyanin and A.V. Manzhirov, Handbook of Integral Equations, CRC Press, Boca Raton, 1998. 
  
 
 

 Mathews, Jon; Walker, Robert L. (1970), Mathematical methods of physics (2nd ed.), New York: W. A. Benjamin,

External links 
 IntEQ: a Python package for numerically solving Fredholm integral equations

Fredholm theory
Integral equations